See Tira for other sites with similar names.

Al-Tira, was a Palestinian Arab village in the District of Baysan. It was depopulated by the Israel Defense Forces during the 1947–48 Civil War in Mandatory Palestine on 15 April 1948 as part of Operation Gideon under the command of Yosef Weitz. It was located 17.5 km north of Baysan overlooking Wadi al-Bira. However, 'Ayn al-Bayda' was the main source of drinking water for al-Tira inhabitants.

History
It has been suggested that this was Atara of the list of Thothmes III.

In 1875, in the late Ottoman era, Victor Guérin climbed a small hill to reach the Al-Tira village. It consisted of about a dozen houses, built of adobe or assorted materials.
In 1882,  the PEF's Survey of Western Palestine described it as: "A small village, principally of adobe, on a hill-top, above a deep gorge. The water appears to be brought from the springs in the valley."

British Mandate era
In  the 1922 census of Palestine, conducted by the  Mandatory Palestine authorities,  Tireh had a population of 130 Muslims, decreasing in the  1931 census   to 108, still all  Muslims, in 24  houses.

In the  1945 statistics the population of Et Tira  and Irgun Borokhov was 200; 150 Arabs and 50 Jews,  while the total land area was 10,207 dunams, according to an official land and population survey.  Of this, Arabs used 54 dunums  for plantations and irrigable land, 4,326 for cereals, while 29 dunums were classified as built-up (urban) land.

1948, aftermath
In his diary, Weitz wrote of the inhabitants of  Qumya and Al-Tira in the Baysan valley on the 26 March 1948:"Not taking upon themselves the responsibility of preventing the infiltration of irregulars ... They must be forced to leave their villages until peace comes.

In order to block the return of the villagers, the kibbutz Gazit was established on the land of village land in September 1948, 1.5 km southwest of the village site.

In 1992 the village site was described: "The ruins of stone houses, covered with grass and thorns, are all that remain of al-Tira. The site is fenced in and servers Israeli farmers as pasture land. Cupress trees grow on surrounding land."

References

Bibliography

External links
Welcome To al-Tira
al-Tira (Baysan),  Zochrot
Survey of Western Palestine, map 9:   IAA, Wikimedia commons
Al-Tira, from  Khalil Sakakini Cultural Center

Arab villages depopulated during the 1948 Arab–Israeli War